Shihu Township is a township in Guzhen County, Anhui, China. , it administers Shihu Residential Neighborhood and the following ten villages:
Qihu Village
Dingxiang Village
Sangwei Village
Zhonghuang Village
Liuyuan Village
Chenqiao Village
Xuci Village
Dougou Village
Houma Village
Kanghu Village

References 

Township-level divisions of Anhui
Guzhen County